Scott Lomax (born 1982) was a campaigner and true crime author who wrote about the case of the convicted murderer Jeremy Bamber, and also about the innocence of Barry George who was acquitted of the murder of Jill Dando on 1 August 2008 after a retrial ordered by the Court of Appeal. He was author of a number of books and articles, the most notable being Who Killed Jill Dando?, Justice for Jill and Jeremy Bamber, Evil, Almost Beyond Belief?

Lomax wrote stories, articles and books since the age of 8. His work concentrated on issues of justice and he claimed his desire to fight for justice came from a conversation with his grandfather.

Campaigns
Lomax was a human rights campaigner, having helped successfully campaign for the release of two men wrongly convicted of conspiring to commit armed robbery. Lomax ran the campaign for one of the men; James (Shay) Power. Lomax also helped run the Justice for Barry campaign to free Barry George.

One of Lomax's cases was that of James Harry Reyos, an American Indian convicted of killing an Irish Priest in Texas, USA. Father Patrick Ryan was killed in Odessa, Texas, on 21 December 1981 and Reyos was found guilty two years later. Lomax helped run the campaign to exonerate Reyos.

In addition to working on cases of alleged injustices, Lomax wrote about unsolved murders in Derbyshire, published in the autumn of 2009 and South Yorkshire, published in February 2013. In later years he wrote books about the archaeology of Nottingham (2013) and the home front in Sheffield and Derbyshire during the First World War.

Lomax campaigned for tougher sentences for serious crimes such as paedophilia, rape and murder. He also campaigned for Peter Sutcliffe (the Yorkshire Ripper) to be moved from Broadmoor secure hospital, to a prison.

In 2009 Lomax made an appeal bid to have the sentences of Dano Sonnex and Nigel Farmer (convicted of murdering two French students in London) increased to whole life tariffs. His attempts to persuade the Attorney General to refer the case to the Court of Appeal on the grounds that the sentences were unduly lenient were unsuccessful, however.

Education
Lomax lived in Derbyshire and was an archaeologist, writing in his spare time. He graduated from the University of Sheffield in 2004 with a degree in Archaeology and Prehistory.

Bibliography
The Home Front: Derbyshire in the First World War
The Home Front: Sheffield in the First World War
Nottingham: The Buried Past of a Historic City Revealed
Unsolved Murders in South Yorkshire
Deadly Derbyshire
Unsolved Murders in and Around Derbyshire
Jeremy Bamber: Evil, Almost Beyond Belief?
Justice for Jill
Who Killed Jill Dando?
The Case of Barry George
Particle of Doubt a chapter in CSI, edited by Roger Wilkes

References

1982 births
Living people
Non-fiction crime writers